Nyi Pu (12 September 1900 – 1 September 1996) was a Burmese actor and film director. He was the first film actor in Burmese cinema. His youngest brother was Tin Maung, an accomplished film director.

Biography
Nyi Pu was born Ba Htay on 12 September 1900 in Prome (Pyay), the second son of Ba Nyunt and Nyein Shin during the British colonial era. In 1920, Ba Htay participated in the First University Strike against the British rulers. In the same year, he along with photographer Maung Maung assisted Ohn Maung who was looking to make films in Burma. In 1920, using the screen name Nyi Pu (lit. Short Brother) starred in the first-ever film Myitta Nit Athuyar in Burma. He made many more silent films in the 1920s and 1930s. After World War II, he made a few more films in the 1950s and 1960s. He was chairman of Myanmar Motion Picture Organization from 1969 to 1972.

Nyi Pu died on 1 September 1996 at Yangon, and was survived by his wife San Yin and their five children.

Filmography
Myitta Nit Athuyar (actor) 1920
Kyay-Taw-Thu Ma Nu (actor) 1921
Taw Myaing Zon Ga Lwan Aung Phan, (actor and director) 1923
Ta Khaing Lone Shwe, (actor) 1924
Mhaing Wai Wai, (actor) 1925
Thamaing Nyut Paung, (actor) 1933
Su Htoo Pan, (actor and director) 1929
Shwe Hninzi, (actor and director) 1931
Japan Yin Thwe (actor and director) 1935
Kyar Thit Mae, 1923
Pa Loat Tot Tot, (actor and director) 1925
Sekkya Shin, (actor and director) 1925
Shwe Min Wun, (actor and director) 1926
Mya Ta Bat, (actor and director) 1927
Mya Aye Yin, 1927
Myaing Nan San, 1926
Chit Thwe Nyi Nyi, 1931
Chit Yay Sin, (actor and director) 1935
Pan Thitsa, 1954
Than Khamauk, 1935
San Yay Yin, 1936
Chit Lu Youn, 1938 (Audio Film)
Ko Yin Thwe, 1955
Chit Thanthaya, 1957
528, 1958
Nan That Ka Pan Ta Khat, 1963
Ma Maung Taw A Lin, 1965
Tha Man Kyar, 1970

References

Burmese male film actors
Burmese film directors
1900 births
1996 deaths
People from Bago Region
20th-century Burmese male actors